Borja Viguera Manzanares (born 26 March 1987) is a Spanish professional footballer who plays as a striker.

He achieved totals of 51 games and three goals in La Liga for Real Sociedad, Athletic Bilbao and Sporting de Gijón. He also made 100 Segunda División appearances and scored 28 goals for five clubs, finishing as top scorer for the 2013–14 season for Alavés.

Club career

Real Sociedad
Born in Logroño, La Rioja, Viguera graduated from Real Sociedad's prolific youth setup, and made his senior debut with the reserves in 2006–07, in Segunda División B. He played his first match as a professional on 15 September 2007, coming on as a substitute for Iñigo Díaz de Cerio in a 3–2 away win against UD Las Palmas in the Segunda División. He made a further four appearances with the main squad during the following season, as they missed out on promotion by finishing fourth.

Viguera was definitely promoted to Real's first team in June 2009, but featured rarely as the Basques were crowned champions. On 11 January 2011, he joined Gimnàstic de Tarragona on loan until June, suffering a knee injury the following month that ruled him out for the remainder of the campaign.

On 26 August 2011, Viguera returned to Nàstic again in a temporary deal. After being sparingly used by the Catalans he returned to Real Sociedad on 31 January 2012, and was subsequently loaned to Albacete Balompié of the third tier.

Alavés
On 6 July 2012, Viguera joined neighbouring Deportivo Alavés also in division three. He was an ever-present figure in his first year, scoring 21 goals in all competitions to help his team achieve promotion to the second tier in the play-offs.

Viguera extended his contract with the club on 14 August 2013, until 2015. He netted 25 times during the season, as the side narrowly avoided relegation; highlights included a hat-trick at CE Sabadell FC on 8 February 2014 in a 4–0 victory.

Athletic Bilbao
On 13 June 2014, Viguera signed a three-year deal with Athletic Bilbao for €1 million. He scored his first La Liga goal for his new team on 21 November, the second of a 3–1 home win over RCD Espanyol.

Sporting Gijón
Viguera agreed to a two-year contract at Sporting de Gijón on 30 August 2016. He scored just once in the league during his first season, which ended in relegation, and featured even less in the following.

Numancia
On 1 August 2018, free agent Viguera signed a two-year contract with CD Numancia. He played 24 total games (five starts) and scored once, a late penalty that was the only goal of the game at home to Real Zaragoza on 13 October.

Viguera cut ties with the club on 4 September 2019.

Later career
Viguera signed with third-tier Real Unión on 22 January 2020. On 31 August the following year, he moved to CF Intercity in the new fourth-tier Segunda División RFEF. He was used mainly off the bench for the eventually promoted team from Sant Joan d'Alacant, including on 9 January 2022 when he scored his only goal to earn a 1–1 home draw against CF La Nucía.

Career statistics

Club

References

External links

1987 births
Living people
Sportspeople from Logroño
Spanish footballers
Footballers from La Rioja (Spain)
Association football forwards
La Liga players
Segunda División players
Segunda División B players
Segunda Federación players
Real Sociedad B footballers
Real Sociedad footballers
Gimnàstic de Tarragona footballers
Albacete Balompié players
Deportivo Alavés players
Athletic Bilbao footballers
Sporting de Gijón players
CD Numancia players
Real Unión footballers
CF Intercity players